Sione Vuna Fa'otusia (24 February 1953 – 29 August 2021) was a Tongan politician, Cabinet Minister, and Member of the Legislative Assembly of Tonga who served as the deputy prime minister of Tonga from 2019 to 2020.

Personal life
Fa'otusia received a Bachelor of Laws from the University of New South Wales Faculty of Law, a Master's degree from the London School of Economics, and a Postgraduate Diploma in Legal Practice.

Prior to entering politics Fa'otusia was a member of the Tongan Public Servants Association and chair of its strike committee during Tonga's 2005 public service strike. From 2006 to 2008, he was Chief Executive Officer of the Ministry of Justice.  He later moved to private practice.  He was counsel to the Shipping Corporation of Polynesia Ltd, owners of the MV Princess Ashika.

In January 2019 Fa'otusia was charged with wrongful interference with the course of justice and using threatening language in a dispute over a stolen cow. In December 2019 he was acquitted after a judge found there was insufficient evidence. An appeal by the crown saw the case return to the Supreme Court in December 2020.

Fa'otusia married for the first time after his 67th birthday.  He died on 29 August 2021, in Auckland, New Zealand.

Political career
Fa'otusia was elected as a Democratic Party of the Friendly Islands (DPFI) candidate at the 2014 Tongan general election and appointed as Minister of Justice in the cabinet of ʻAkilisi Pōhiva. He was re-elected in the 2017 Tongan general election and reappointed to Cabinet. As Justice Minister Fa'otusia appointed the first Tongan judge to the Supreme Court of Tonga in over a hundred years, and aims to have an all-Tongan Court by 2020. He has also publicly supported capital punishment.

Following the death of ʻAkilisi Pōhiva, Fa'otusia supported Pohiva Tuʻiʻonetoa for Prime Minister, leaving the DPFI to join Tuʻiʻonetoa's new People's Party. He was appointed to Tuʻiʻonetoa's Cabinet as Deputy Prime Minister and Minister for Justice and Prisons.

In December 2020 he joined other PTOA members in signing a motion of no confidence against Prime Minister Tuʻiʻonetoa. He subsequently resigned as a Minister.

References

1953 births
2021 deaths
Tongan lawyers
Members of the Legislative Assembly of Tonga
Deputy Prime Ministers of Tonga
Justice ministers of Tonga
Democratic Party of the Friendly Islands politicians
People from Tongatapu
University of New South Wales Law School alumni
Alumni of the London School of Economics